The 1934 New South Wales Rugby Football League premiership was the twenty-seventh season of Sydney’s top-grade rugby league club competition, Australia’s first. Eight teams from across the city contested the premiership during the season which lasted from April until September and culminated in Western Suburbs’ victory over Eastern Suburbs in the premiership final.

Season summary
At the height of The Depression, the New South Wales Rugby Football League again banned radio broadcasts of matches, blaming them for a severe drop in crowd numbers.

In Round 2 the University club began a losing streak which would run until the fourteenth round of the 1936 season, marking the record for the most consecutive losses in premiership history at 42.

Teams
 Balmain, formed on January 23, 1908, at Balmain Town Hall
 Eastern Suburbs, formed on January 24, 1908, at Paddington Town Hall
 Newtown, formed on January 14, 1908
 North Sydney, formed on February 7, 1908
 South Sydney, formed on January 17, 1908, at Redfern Town Hall
 St. George, formed on November 8, 1920, at Kogarah School of Arts
 Western Suburbs, formed on February 4, 1908
 University, formed in 1919 at Sydney University

Ladder

Finals
In the two semi finals, the top two ranked teams Western Suburbs and Eastern Suburbs beat their lower-ranked opponents St. George and South Sydney. The two winners then played in a final in which Western beat Eastern Suburbs.

Premiership Final

After a hurried conference on Saturday, 1 September 1934, the league postponed the final for a week because of heavy rain and adverse ground conditions. It was the first postponement in the competition’s twenty-seven-year history. Eastern Suburbs players Viv Thicknesse and Stan Tancred made a return for the final which was refereed by J Murphy before a crowd of 25,174.

Western Suburbs captain Frank McMillan won the toss and ran with the wind before Les Mead opened with a penalty goal. Regular stoppages for infringements ensued before Jack Beaton kicked accurately to level the match at 2–2. Western Suburbs Test winger Alan Ridley scored the first try of the match, crashing over on the right wing after powering through the defence. McMillan’s conversion made it 7–2, with the score remaining unchanged at halftime.

After the break, Thicknesse hit back for Eastern Suburbs and crossed after excellent lead up work by Joe Pearce. Beaton missed the conversion but Dave Brown steered through a penalty from a scrum infringement shortly after and the scores were level at 7–7. Rain began to fall as Western Suburbs gathered momentum. The play shifted to Easts’ line and Vince Sheehan crossed for an unconverted try and Western Suburbs led 10–7. Eastern Suburbs continued to defend grimly before Western Suburbs surged to a comfortable 15–7 lead. Vic Hey received a lobbed pass and got the ball to Alan Ridley who scored under the upright for Mead to convert. The Roosters’ chances came in the final stages and Andy Norval crossed for his team’s second try, although the referee appeared to miss a blatant knock-on. Beaton converted but it was all too late, with Western Suburbs claiming their second premiership.

A great victory by a great team who upset the star-studded Eastern Suburbs, who went on to win the next three titles. Alan Ridley played one of the best games for Western Suburbs along with team-mates Mead, Hey, Brady, Tancred. Current test skipper Frank McMillan (141 games) and hooker Bob Lindfield (138 matches) announced their retirement after the victory and were chaired from the field by team-mates.
  
Western Suburbs 15 (Tries: Alan Ridley 2, Vince Sheehan. Goals: Les Mead 2, Frank McMillan)

Eastern Suburbs 12 (Tries: Andy Norval, Viv Thicknesse. Goals: Jack Beaton 2, Dave Brown)

References

External links
 Rugby League Tables - Notes AFL Tables
 Rugby League Tables - Season 1934 AFL Tables
 Premiership History and Statistics RL1908
 Results: 1931-40 at rabbitohs.com.au

Nswrfl season
New South Wales Rugby League premiership